Al Fredrick Smith (born November 26, 1964) is a former American football linebacker in the National Football League. He played college football for Utah State University and for the Cal Poly Pomona Broncos. He played in National Football League for the Houston Oilers.

References 

1964 births
Living people
Players of American football from Los Angeles
American football linebackers
Utah State Aggies football players
Houston Oilers players
American Conference Pro Bowl players
Cal Poly Pomona Broncos football players